Phlogophora albovittata is a species of moth of the family Noctuidae. It is found from the Himalaya to Japan and Taiwan.

The wingspan is 37–42 mm.

References

Moths described in 1867
Hadeninae
Moths of Japan